HMCS Thetford Mines was a River-class frigate that served with the Royal Canadian Navy during the Second World War. She served primarily as a convoy escort in the Battle of the Atlantic. She was named for Thetford Mines, Quebec.

Thetford Mines was ordered in October 1941 as part of the 1942–1943 River-class building program. She was laid down on 7 July 1943 by Morton Engineering & Dry Dock Co. at Quebec City, Quebec and launched 30 October later that year. She was commissioned into the Royal Canadian Navy on 24 May 1944 at Quebec City.

Background

The River-class frigate was designed by William Reed of Smith's Dock Company of South Bank-on-Tees. Originally called a "twin-screw corvette", its purpose was to improve on the convoy escort classes in service with the Royal Navy at the time, including the Flower-class corvette. The first orders were placed by the Royal Navy in 1940 and the vessels were named for rivers in the United Kingdom, giving name to the class. In Canada they were named for towns and cities though they kept the same designation. The name "frigate" was suggested by Vice-Admiral Percy Nelles of the Royal Canadian Navy and was adopted later that year.

Improvements over the corvette design included improved accommodation which was markedly better. For underwater targets, the River-class frigate was equipped with a Hedgehog anti-submarine mortar and depth charge rails aft and four side-mounted throwers.

River-class frigates were the first Royal Canadian Navy warships to carry the 147B Sword horizontal fan echo sonar transmitter in addition to the irregular ASDIC. This allowed the ship to maintain contact with targets even while firing unless a target was struck. Improved radar and direction-finding equipment improved the RCN's ability to find and track enemy submarines over the previous classes.

Canada originally ordered the construction of 33 frigates in October 1941. The design was too big for the shipyards on the Great Lakes so all the frigates built in Canada were built in dockyards along the west coast or along the St. Lawrence River. In all Canada ordered the construction of 60 frigates including ten for the Royal Navy that transferred two to the United States Navy.

War service
After working up in Bermuda, Thetford Mines was assigned to escort group EG 25 based out of Halifax and performed local escort duties. She transferred with the group in November 1944 to Derry. Two of the survivors died after rescue and were buried at sea.

Thetford Mines remained in the waters surrounding the United Kingdom until the end of hostilities in Europe. On 11 May 1945 she arrived at Lough Foyle escorting eight surrendered U-boats. Later that month she returned to Canada and was paid off on 18 November 1945 at Sydney, Nova Scotia and laid up at Shelburne.

Postwar service
Thetford Mines was sold in 1947 to a Honduran buyer who intended to turn her into a refrigerated mercantile vessel, primarily to carry fruit. She was converted and renamed Thetis. Her fate is unknown.

References
Notes

References
Macpherson, Ken; Burgess, John. The ships of Canada's naval forces 1910–1981 : a complete pictorial history of Canadian warships. Collins: Toronto, 1981. 

 

River-class frigates of the Royal Canadian Navy
1943 ships